Helsdingenia is a genus of dwarf spiders that was first described by Michael I. Saaristo & A. V. Tanasevitch in 2003. The name is a reference to Dr. P. J van Helsdingen.

Males are smaller than females, but females are distinguishable by their finger-like extensions in epigyne. There are four pairs of dark spots in an abdominal pattern that are connected to each other, creating two parallel stripes.

Species
 it contains four species, found in Cameroon, Comoros, Indonesia, on Madagascar, Nepal, Nigeria, and Sri Lanka:
Helsdingenia ceylonica (van Helsdingen, 1985) (type) – Nepal, Sri Lanka
Helsdingenia extensa (Locket, 1968) – St. Helena, Africa, Madagascar, Comoros
Helsdingenia hebes (Locket & Russell-Smith, 1980) – Nigeria, Cameroon
Helsdingenia hebesoides Saaristo & Tanasevitch, 2003 – Indonesia (Sumatra)

See also
 List of Linyphiidae species (A–H)

References

Araneomorphae genera
Linyphiidae
Spiders of Africa
Spiders of Asia